Statistics of UAE Football League for the 2004–05 season.

Overview
It was contested by 14 teams, and Al-Wahda FC (Abu Dhabi) won the championship.

League standings

References
United Arab Emirates - List of final tables (RSSSF)

UAE Pro League seasons
United
1